Roberto Anderson (1921 – 5 March 1974) was a field hockey player who competed for Argentina at the 1948 Summer Olympics, he played in all three group games, scoring one goal against Spain.

References

External links
 

Olympic field hockey players of Argentina
Argentine male field hockey players
Field hockey players at the 1948 Summer Olympics
1921 births
1974 deaths